Beat Me is the sixth album of Japanese band Electric Eel Shock and was released in 2006.

The album was mixed and mastered from December 2004 to January 2005 at Bauwhaus Studios in Amsterdam, The Netherlands. The bonus tracks were recorded live at De Effenaar in Eindhoven, The Netherlands.

The song "I Love Fish But Fish Hate Me" has special meaning for Morimoto as a former competition angler. Amongst the reasons given as what inspired the song was "Fish don't want to get the hook in their mouth. I love fish but... yeah... I think they totally hate me."

A poster for this album appears in season two of the television show Kyle XY in the bedroom of the character Lori Trager (between the door and the closet).

Track listing 

The track list is for the Roadrunner (Japan) release of this album. The Roadrunner (Japan) release of this album is also an Enhanced CD containing video clips for "Scream For Me" and "Bastard".

Release history 

 

The Roadrunner release was issued under license from Demolition.

Personnel 
 Akihito Morimoto - Guitar/Vocals
 Kazuto Maekawa - Bass
 Tomoharu "Gian" Ito - Drums
 Attie Bauw - Producer, Engineer, Mixing and Mastering
 Tim Bray - Assistant Engineer
 Akihiro Shiba - Mastering for Japanese bonus tracks
 Bob Slayer - EES Shogun & Manager

References 

Electric Eel Shock albums
2005 albums